The Calumet Hotel, also known as the Esquire Hotel, is a former hotel building located in downtown Portland, Oregon, that is listed on the National Register of Historic Places. The building was changed from a commercial hotel to a residential hotel for low-income residents in the 1930s. At some point, it took the name Esquire Hotel.  By the time of its nomination to the National Register, in 1983, it was vacant. The building was renovated in 2008–09 and is now known as "The Esquire" apartments.

See also
 National Register of Historic Places listings in Southwest Portland, Oregon

References

External links

1907 establishments in Oregon
French Renaissance architecture
Hotel buildings completed in 1907
Hotel buildings on the National Register of Historic Places in Portland, Oregon
Joseph Jacobberger buildings
Portland Historic Landmarks
Southwest Portland, Oregon
Apartment buildings on the National Register of Historic Places in Portland, Oregon